Brăduleț, formerly Brătieni, is a commune in Argeș County, Muntenia, Romania. It is composed of nine villages: Alunișu, Brădetu, Brăduleț, Cosaci, Galeșu, Piatra, Slămnești, Uleni and Ungureni.

References

Communes in Argeș County
Localities in Muntenia